Pulai Indah is a township in the north of Mukim Pulai, city of Iskandar Puteri, district of Johor Bahru, State of Johor Darul Ta'zim, Malaysia. The township is bordered by Pulai Hijauan and Bandar Baru Kangkar Pulai to the north, and Pulai Mutiara to the south. The rest area on it perimeter is covered in green. This township is being developed by Huayang Berhad since 2008, and ready for occupation from 2010 onward.

Education

Sekolah Agama Taman Pulai Indah
This religious school located near Surau Nurussalam, is the only school in Taman Pulai Indah. The school taught Islamic teaching to the Muslim children in Taman Pulai Indah

Religion

Mosque

Masjid Taman Pulai Indah
Masjid Taman Pulai Indah is the largest most in north Pulai. The mosque is funded through donation from the public and open for worshipper in 2018. The opening ceremony was officiated by His Majesty Sultan Ibrahim Ismail the ruler of Johor and her sovereign. The mosque is always full with congregation and is one of the busiest mosque in Johor.

Surau Nurussalam
Surau Nurussalam at Jalan Ariza is the first mosque in Taman Pulai Indah. The mosque also held Friday prayer prior to the opening of Masjid Taman Pulai Indah.

Surau As-Sakinah
Surau As-Sakinah is located at Jalan Bayan.

Temple
There is one Chinese temple located at Jalan Gapis for Chinese population.

Community

Capital of Northern Pulai
Pulai Indah is dubbed as the capital of northern Pulai. In 2020, at least two chieftain in Kulai and Johor Bahru, and six councillors of Iskandar Puteri City Council and Kulai Municipal Council comes from Pulai Indah.

See also
Iskandar Puteri
Pulai Mutiara, Johor
Pulai Hijauan, Johor
Bandar Baru Kangkar Pulai
Kangkar Pulai

References

Iskandar Puteri
Townships in Johor
Towns and suburbs in Johor Bahru District